Roman Jakič (born 1 May 1967 in Ljubljana) is a Slovenian politician. He was a Member of the European Parliament in 2004 and served as defence minister from 2013 to 2014.

References

See also 

 List of members of the European Parliament for Slovenia, 2004

1967 births
Living people
Defence ministers of Slovenia
21st-century Slovenian politicians
Liberal Democracy of Slovenia politicians
Positive Slovenia politicians
University of Ljubljana alumni
MEPs 2004–2009
MEPs for Slovenia 2004–2009
Members of the National Assembly (Slovenia)
Politicians from Ljubljana